Eparchy is an ecclesiastical unit in Eastern Christianity.

The term may also refer to:

 Eparchy (Roman province), a Greek term for a province, in the Roman Republic and Empire
 Eparchy (Byzantine province), a Greek term for a province, in the early Byzantine Empire
 Eparchy (modern Greece), an administrative unit in modern Greece
 Eparchy (modern Cyprus), an administrative unit in modern Cyprus

See also
 Province (disambiguation)